The Ganbare 35 is a Canadian sailboat that was designed by American Doug Peterson as an International Offshore Rule One Ton class racer-cruiser and first built in 1973.

The Ganbare 35 is a development of the one-off Petersen-designed One Ton Cup racer Ganbare. The name is derived from the Japanese term, meaning stand firm.

Production
The design was built by Cooper Enterprises in Port Coquitlam, British Columbia and also by Martin Yachts, starting in 1973. A total of 35 boats were built before production ended.

Design
The Ganbare 35 is a racing keelboat, built predominantly of fibreglass, with wood trim. It has a masthead sloop rig, a raked stem, a reverse transom, an internally mounted spade-type rudder controlled by a tiller and a fixed fin keel. It displaces  and carries  of lead ballast.

Operational history
The boat is supported by an active class club that organizes racing events, the One Ton Class.

See also
List of sailing boat types

References

Keelboats
1970s sailboat type designs
Sailing yachts
Trailer sailers
Sailboat type designs by Doug Peterson
Sailboat types built by Cooper Enterprises
Sailboat types built by Martin Yachts